This article lists events from the year 2015 in the Republic of Burundi.

Incumbents
President: Pierre Nkurunziza
 First Vice President - Prosper Bazombanza (until August 20); Gaston Sindimwo (from August 20)
 Second Vice President - Gervais Rufyikiri (until August 20); Joseph Butore (from August 20)

Events

April
 April 26 - The start of the 2015 Burundian unrest. Two protestors die.
 April 27 - 2015 Burundian unrest
 More opposition activists protest on the second day for a protest against a proposal for President Pierre Nkurunziza to run a third term in office.

May
 May 2 - A grenade attack on the capital, Bujumbura, kills two policeman and one civilian and injures three others.
 May 8 - 2015 Burundian unrest
 Protests increase when President Nkurunziza officially registers to run for a third term in office.

References

Links

 
2010s in Burundi
Years of the 21st century in Burundi
Burundi
Burundi